Kafr Bir'im, also Kefr Berem, was a former village in Mandatory Palestine, located in modern-day northern Israel,  south of the Lebanese border and  northwest of Safed.

In ancient times, it was a Jewish village known as Kfar Bar'am. It was an Arab village in the Middle Ages. In the early Ottoman era it was wholly Muslim. During the 19th and 20th centuries, it was noted as a Maronite Christian village. In 1945, 710 people lived in Kafr Bir'im, most of them Christians. 

On September 16, 1953 the village was destroyed by the Israeli Air Force, in order to prevent the villagers' return and in defiance of an Israeli Supreme Court decision recognizing the villager's right to return to their homes. By 1992, the only standing structure was the church and belltower.

The village of Iqrit had the same fate.

History

Antiquity
The village was originally Kfar Bar'am, a Jewish village which was established in ancient times. The remains of the 3rd-century Kfar Bar'am synagogue on the outskirts of the town are still visible, as is another ruined synagogue in the center of the village.

Middle Ages
A visitor in the thirteenth century described an Arab village containing the remains of two ancient synagogues.

Ottoman period
In 1596, Kafr Bir'im appeared in Ottoman tax registers as being in the Nahiya of Jira, part of Sanjak Safad. It had a population of 114 households and 22 bachelors; all noted as Muslim. The villagers paid taxes on wheat, barley, goats and beehives, but most of the taxes were paid as a fixed sum; total revenue was 13,400 akçe.

Kafr Bir'im was badly damaged in the Galilee earthquake of 1837. The local church and a row of columns from the ancient synagogue collapsed. In 1838 it was noted as a Maronite village in the Safad region.

In 1852 it was estimated that the village had a population of 160 males, all Maronites and Melkites. During the 1860 civil war in Lebanon, Muslims and Druzes attacked the Christian village.

In 1881, the PEF's Survey of Western Palestine described the village as being built of stone, surrounded by gardens, olive trees and vineyards, with a population of between 300 and 500.

A population list from about 1887 showed Kefr Bir’im to have about 1,285 inhabitants, all Christian.

British rule
In the 1922 census of Palestine, conducted by the British Mandate authorities, Kufr Berim had a population of 469; all Christians, all being Maronites. By the 1931 census there were 554 people in the village; 547 Christians and 7 Muslims, in a total of 132 houses.

In the 1945 statistics, Kafr Bir'im had a population of 710, consisting of 10 Muslims and 700 Christians, with 12,250 dunams of land, according to an official land and population survey. Of this, 1,101 dunams were irrigated or used for plantations, 3,718 for cereals, while 96 dunams were classified as urban land.
The village population in 1948 was estimated as 1,050 inhabitants.

Israeli rule
 
Kafr Bir'im was captured by the Haganah on October 31, 1948 during Operation Hiram. In November 1948 most of the inhabitants were expelled until the military operation was complete, and none were subsequently permitted to return. Today the villagers and their descendants number about 2,000 people in Israel. In addition, there are villagers and descendants in Lebanon and in western countries.

In 1949, with cross-border infiltration a frequent occurrence, Israel did not allow the villagers to return to Bir'im on the grounds that Jewish settlement at the place would deter infiltration. Kibbutz Bar'am was established by demobilized soldiers on the lands of the village.

In 1953, the residents of former Kafr Bir'im appealed to the Supreme Court of Israel to return to their village. The court ruled that the authorities must answer to why they were not allowed to return. In September, the court ruled that the villagers should be allowed to return to their homes, however after the court ruling, an Israeli Air Force bombing on September 16, 1953 left the village razed and 1,170 hectares of land were expropriated by the state.

The leader of Melkite Greek Catholics in Israel, Archbishop Georgios Hakim, alerted the Vatican and other church authorities, and the Israeli government offered the villagers compensation. Archbishop Hakim accepted compensation for the land belonging to the village church.

In the summer of 1972, the villagers of Kafr Bir'im and Iqrit went back to repair their churches and refused to leave. Their action was supported by archbishop Hakim's successor, Archbishop Joseph Raya. The police removed them by force. The government barred the return of the villagers so as not to create a precedent. In August 1972, a large group of Israeli Jews went to Kafr Bir'im and Iqrit to show solidarity with the villagers. Several thousand turned out for a demonstration in Jerusalem. The Israeli authorities said most of the inhabitants of the village had received compensation for their losses, but the villagers said they had only been compensated for small portions of their holdings. In 1972, the government rescinded all "closed regions" laws in the country, but then reinstated these laws for the two villages Kafr Bir'im and Iqrit.

This was met with criticism by the opposition parties. In the 1977 election campaign Menachem Begin, then leader of the right-wing Likud party, promised the villagers that they could return home if he was elected. This promise became a great embarrassment to him after he had won, and a decision on the issue was postponed as long as possible. It was left to his agriculture minister to reveal to the public that a special cabinet committee had decided that the villagers of Kafr Bir'im and Iqrit would not be allowed to return.

The operational name of the Munich massacre of Israeli athletes in 1972 was named after this village and Iqrit.

On the occasion of official visits to Israel by popes John Paul II in 2000 and Benedict XVI in 2009, the villagers made public appeals to the Vatican for help in their endeavour to return to Kafr Bir'im, but have so far remained unsuccessful.

See also
 Correcting a Mistake: Jews and Arabs in Palestine/Israel, 1936-1956
 Present absentee
 Depopulated Palestinian locations in Israel

References

Bibliography

  
 Chacour, E.:  "Blood Brothers. A Palestinian Struggles for Reconciliation in the Middle East"  with Hazard, David, and Baker III, James A., Secretary (Foreword by)  2nd Expanded ed. 2003.
Dalrymple, W. (1997): From the Holy Mountain, Harper Collins,  p. 268-9, 271,  275-6, 363,  365-72. Dalrymple interviewed Sarah Daou from Kafr Bir'im and goes there to find her relatives.
 

 pp. 102–103
  

Jiryis, S.: The Arabs in Israel 1st American edition 1976  (updated from the 1966 ed.) With a foreword by Noam Chomsky. (First English edition; Beirut, Institute for Palestine Studies, 1968). Chapter 4.
  
  
Morris, B. and Black, I. (1991): Israel's Secret Wars: A History of Israel's Intelligence Services  (Grove Press, 1991)

External links
Kufr Birim, from Electronic Intifada
Welcome To Kafr Bir'im 
Kafr Bir'im, Zochrot 
Survey of Western Palestine, Map 4: IAA, Wikimedia commons
Kafr Bir'im, from the Khalil Sakakini Cultural Center
Kufr Bir3em, from Dr. Moslih Kanaaneh
Kafr Bir’im, Dr. Khalil Rizk.
 by Miki Levi (31/7/2004), from Zochrot
 by Ronit Sela, Bir'im (6/8/2005) from Zochrot
 by Eitan Bronstein, (9.8.2007) from Zochrot

District of Safad
Arab villages depopulated after the 1948 Arab–Israeli War
Maronite communities
Ancient Jewish settlements of Galilee